The Spain national football team represents Spain in international association football and is controlled by the Royal Spanish Football Federation. The Spanish team played their first match during the 1920 Summer Olympics on the 28 August 1920, a 1–0 win over Denmark. During that tournament they also defeated Sweden, Italy and the Netherlands to claim the silver medal after they lost to Belgium in the quarter finals.

The following year, Spain hosted their first match with a 2–0 win over Belgium at the San Mamés Stadium. They played in the 1924 Olympics losing to Italy in the first round. At the 1928 Olympics, they played their first team from outside of Europe, defeating Mexico 7–1 before losing to Italy in the quarter-finals.

From the nation's first fixture to the end of the decade, Spain played in 32 fixtures, winning 23, drawing four and losing the remaining five. Of the side victories, five were over Iberian neighbors Portugal and four were against France. Against Italy though, they only won once from seven attempts during this period.

Results
Spain's score is shown first in each case.

1920s

1930s

See also
 Spain national football team results

References

External links
Todos los partidos (all the games) at Selección Española de Fútbol (official site) 

1920s in Spain
1920
1930s in Spain